Andrei Aleksandrovich Zavyalov (Andriy Oleksandrovych Zavyalov; born 2 January 1971 in Bila Tserkva) is a Ukraine-born Turkmen football coach and former player.

Career

He started his career with FC Dynamo Kyiv.

Honours
Dynamo Kyiv
Ukrainian Premier League champion: 1992–93, 1993–94
Ukrainian Cup winner: 1992–93

International
He represented Turkmenistan national football team at the 1998 Asian Games.

References

1971 births
People from Bila Tserkva
Living people
Soviet footballers
FC Ros Bila Tserkva players
Turkmenistan footballers
FC Dynamo Kyiv players
Turkmenistan expatriate footballers
Turkmenistan expatriate sportspeople in Ukraine
Ukrainian Premier League players
FC Dynamo-2 Kyiv players
FC Nyva Vinnytsia players
FC KAMAZ Naberezhnye Chelny players
Expatriate footballers in Russia
Russian Premier League players
FC Spartak Ivano-Frankivsk players
Turkmenistan international footballers
FC Metalurh Donetsk players
FC Oleksandriya players
FC Kryvbas Kryvyi Rih players
Hapoel Rishon LeZion F.C. players
Expatriate footballers in Israel
FC Hoverla Uzhhorod players
FC CSKA Kyiv players
FC Kyzylzhar players
Expatriate footballers in Kazakhstan
FC Stal Kamianske players
Turkmenistan football managers
Turkmenistan expatriate football managers
Ukrainian expatriate football managers
Expatriate football managers in Ukraine
Turkmenistan people of Ukrainian descent
Footballers at the 1998 Asian Games
FC Poltava managers
FC Karlivka managers
Association football midfielders
Turkmenistan expatriate sportspeople in Russia
Turkmenistan expatriate sportspeople in Israel
Turkmenistan expatriate sportspeople in Kazakhstan
Asian Games competitors for Turkmenistan
Sportspeople from Kyiv Oblast